The climate of South Brazil, which is located below the Tropic of Capricorn in a temperate zone, is influenced by the system of disturbed circulation of the South, which produces the rains, mainly in the summer.
Regarding temperatures: the winter is cool and the summer is hot. Some parts of the southern region also have an oceanic climate.

The average minimum temperature varies from 
, and the thermometer frequently registers temperatures near 0 °C or below, accompanied by frost and snow, in consequence of the invasion of polar masses.

The maximum pluviometric indexes occur in the winter and the minimum in the summer throughout almost the whole area.

Charts of selected cities

External links 
 https://web.archive.org/web/20101206014542/http://www.brazil.org.uk/brazilinbrief/climate.html

South